Biščević is a surname. Notable people with the name include:

 Bulend Biščević (born 1975), Bosnian footballer
 Hidajet Biščević (born 1951), Croatian diplomat of Bosniak descent
 Husejin Biščević (1884-?), Bosnian military officer in the 13th Waffen Mountain Division of the SS Handschar (1st Croatian)

Bosnian surnames